Heliophanus falcatus is a jumping spider species in the genus Heliophanus.  It was first described by Wanda Wesołowska in 1986 and is found in Angola and the Democratic Republic of the Congo. The female of the species was thought to be a separate species Natta immemorata until 2003.

References

Salticidae
Spiders described in 1986
Arthropods of Angola
Fauna of the Democratic Republic of the Congo
Spiders of Africa
Taxa named by Wanda Wesołowska